Mr Gay World 2014, the 6th Mr Gay World competition, was held in Rome, Italy on August 31, 2014. At the end of the event Chris Olwage, Mr Gay World 2013 from New Zealand  crowned Stuart Hatton Mr. Gay U.K., his successor as Mr Gay World 2014.

Results

Special awards
 Mister Gay World Congeniality Winner 2014
 Mister Gay World Art Challenge Winner 2014
 Mister Gay World Online Voting Winner 2014
 Mister Gay World Sports Challenge Winner 2014
 Mister Gay World Photogenic Winner 2014
 Video Presentation Challenge Winner 2014
 DNA Photoshoot Challenge Winner 2014
 Written Test Challenge Winner 2014
  -  Christepher Wee
 Special Challenge Winner (Baking) 2014
  -  Sushant Divgikar

Contestants
32 delegates have been confirmed:

National pageant notes

Debuts

Returning countries
Last competed in 2010:

Last competed in 2011:

Last competed in 2012:

References 

2014
2014 beauty pageants
Beauty pageants in Italy
2014 in Italy
2014 in LGBT history
August 2014 events in Italy
2010s in Rome